Nation and Race: The Developing Euro-American Racist Subculture is a book edited by Jeffrey Kaplan and Tore Bjørgo.  It collects the papers of an international conference held in New Orleans, from  December 8, 1995 to December 11, 1995.

It was published by Northeastern University Press in 1998 as a 273-page paperback and hardcover.

External links
Nation And Race at the publisher's page.

1998 non-fiction books
Books about the far right
Books by Jeffrey Kaplan
English-language books
Sociology books
University Press of New England books